Paul Vernon Hornung (December 23, 1935 – November 13, 2020), nicknamed "the Golden Boy", was an American professional football player who was a running back for the Green Bay Packers of the National Football League (NFL) from 1957 to 1966. He played on teams that won four NFL titles and the first Super Bowl. He is the first Heisman Trophy winner to be selected as the first overall selection in the NFL Draft, play pro football, win the NFL most valuable player award, and be inducted into both the Pro Football Hall of Fame and College Football Hall of Fame. Packers coach Vince Lombardi stated that Hornung was "the greatest player I ever coached."

A versatile player, Hornung was a halfback, quarterback, and placekicker. He was an excellent all-around college athlete at Notre Dame, where he played basketball in addition to football.

Early years
Hornung was born and raised in Louisville, Kentucky. He was the son of Paul Vernon Hornung Sr. and Loretta Williams. He was an outstanding athlete at Flaget High School in Louisville, and lettered all four years in football, basketball, and baseball.  He was recruited by Bear Bryant at Kentucky in nearby Lexington, but chose to attend Notre Dame instead.

College career
After spending his sophomore season of 1954 as a backup fullback, Hornung blossomed as a halfback and safety during his junior year in 1955. He finished fourth in the nation in total offense with 1,215 yards and six touchdowns. His two touchdowns on offense and two interceptions on defense spurred a victory over No. 4 Navy, and his touchdown pass and field goal beat Iowa. In a loss to Southern California, Hornung ran and threw for 354 yards, the best in the nation in 1955.

In the 1956 season he led his team offensively in passing, rushing, scoring, kickoff and punt returns, and punting. He also played defense, led in passes broken up, and was second in interceptions and tackles made. In spite of Notre Dame's 2–8 record, Hornung won the Heisman Trophy in 1956 as the year's outstanding U.S. college football player – the only time a player from a losing team has been so honored.  Nicknamed "The Golden Boy", the highly versatile quarterback could run, pass, block, and tackle. Many consider Hornung the greatest all-around football player in Notre Dame history.

Hornung also played basketball during his sophomore year at Notre Dame. He has said that he attended Notre Dame in part for the opportunity to play basketball, and that he was asked not to continue playing in order to help keep his grades up.

At the 1957 College All Star game in August in Chicago, Hornung had a famous match race with Abe Woodson. Woodson said, "We had Jim Brown, Jim Parker, John Brodie, Jon Arnett, Len Dawson, Paul Hornung, and Tommy McDonald, with Curly Lambeau and Otto Graham as our coaches, and we still lost 22–7 to the New York Giants. Oh, well."  Just for fun, Woodson, one of the fastest players ever to put on pads, and Hornung agreed to a  match race.  Hornung won by five yards.

Passing statistics

Professional career

After graduating from Notre Dame with a degree in business, Hornung was the first selection overall in the 1957 NFL Draft. He was taken by the Green Bay Packers, with whom he went on to win four league championships, including the first Super Bowl in January 1967.

Hornung was the only Packer on the roster who did not play in Super Bowl I.  A pinched nerve sidelined him, and he chose not to enter the game in the fourth quarter.

As a professional, Hornung played the halfback position as well as field goal kicker for several seasons. Hornung led the league in scoring for three straight seasons from 1959–61. During the 1960 season, the last with just 12 games, he set an all-time record by scoring 176 points. Hornung also passed for two additional touchdowns, which did not add to his point-scoring total. The record stood until the  season, when running back LaDainian Tomlinson of the San Diego Chargers broke the record with 180 points by scoring his 30th touchdown on December 17, leaving him with four points more than Hornung's record with more than two games to play (but in his 14th game, compared to Hornung's 12 games).

In 1961, Hornung set the scoring record in an NFL championship game with 19 points. That record stood for 56 years until James White scored 20 points in Super Bowl LI. In Green Bay's 1965 championship win, he rushed for 105 yards and a touchdown on a very muddy field against the Cleveland Browns. In October of that same year, he set a record for most points in a calendar month with 77. This was also broken by Tomlinson, who posted 78 points in November 2006.

Hornung was voted the league's Most Valuable Player in 1961 and was chosen as an All-Pro twice and named to the Pro Bowl twice. He is one of only nine players to have won both the Heisman Trophy and the NFL's Most Valuable Player Award. He is also the only one to ever make a 50+ yard fair catch kick which came in 1964 on September 13, at the end of the first half of the opener against rival (and defending champion) Chicago.

In 1965 the 29 year-old Hornung scored a team-record five touchdowns (three rushing and two pass receptions) in a 42–27 road win over the Baltimore Colts on December 12. Hornung's five TD's were overshadowed by the record-tying six touchdowns scored by Chicago's Gale Sayers later that same day against San Francisco at Wrigley Field. But the Packers' victory over the Colts proved important for the Packers, as they wound up tied with the Colts in the Western Conference standings at season's end (forcing an extra playoff game on December 26 which the Packers won in overtime to advance to the NFL Championship). In that NFL championship game against the Cleveland Browns on January 2, Hornung ran for 105 yards and a touchdown in the Packers' 23–12 win for their third league title under Lombardi.

A pinched nerve in Hornung's neck severely curtailed his playing time in 1966, and Hornung did not see action in Super Bowl I, when the Packers defeated the Kansas City Chiefs, 35–10. Hornung was selected in the expansion draft by the New Orleans Saints, who later traded for Hornung's backfield mate at Green Bay, Jim Taylor. Hornung never suited up for the Saints, as the neck injury forced him to retire during training camp. Taylor & Hornung were affectionately known as "Thunder & Lightning" by Packer fans of the early 1960s.

Hornung holds the record for most games with 30+ points (2), the most games with 25+ points (3), and the most games with 13 points in a season (8 games in 1960). He also holds the dubious distinction of having missed an NFL record 26 field goals in a season, doing so in 1964.

Honors and awards
Hornung was elected to the College Football Hall of Fame in 1985, the Pro Football Hall of Fame in 1986, and the Wisconsin Athletic Hall of Fame in 1990. Also, the "Paul Hornung Award" is given out annually to the state of Kentucky's top high school player. Starting in 2010, an award named in Hornung's honor is given out to the most versatile college football player in the nation.  Hornung's number 5 was also unofficially retired by Lombardi on July 10, 1967, as there has not been a ceremony to have his number on the wall of retired numbers at Lambeau Field.

Off the field

Hornung was obliged to serve in the U.S. Army and he was called to active duty during the 1961 season, but he was able to get weekend passes to play on Sundays. Head coach Vince Lombardi was a friend of President John F. Kennedy, and a pass was arranged so Hornung could play in the NFL championship game against the New York Giants.

Sport magazine named Hornung the most outstanding player in the 1961 championship game, which led to a tax dispute between Hornung and the Internal Revenue Service that cemented the tax status of awards to athletes. Hornung was awarded a 1962 Chevrolet Corvette, but the car's fair market value was not included on his tax returns for either 1961 or 1962.  The dispute went to the United States Tax Court in the case of Hornung v. Commissioner. The court determined that because it would have been impossible for Hornung to take possession of the Corvette in 1961 – the game was played on December 31 in Green Bay and the car was in a closed dealership in New York – the car should have been included in income in 1962.  More importantly for the athletic community, the court also determined that awards for achievement in the field of athletics do not fall under the exceptions provided under section 74(b) of the Internal Revenue Code.  From this point on, it became impossible for athletes to exclude any awards they are given for athletics from their gross incomes.

Hornung's penchant for high-living proved disastrous when, in 1963, a major scandal erupted and Hornung and another of the league's top stars, defensive tackle Alex Karras of the Detroit Lions, were suspended from football indefinitely in April 1963 by commissioner Pete Rozelle for betting on NFL games and associating with undesirable persons. Forthright in admitting to his mistake, Hornung's image went relatively untarnished, and in 1964 his suspension, and Karras's, were re-evaluated by the league and both were reinstated in March.

In a September 2006 interview with Bob Costas, Hornung stated that it was his belief that it was Lombardi's constant lobbying of Rozelle that got him reinstated for the 1964 NFL season.  In exchange for Lombardi's efforts, Hornung agreed not to have anything to do with gambling, to stay out of Las Vegas and to even forgo attending the Kentucky Derby which he had done annually.

Hornung was employed as a color analyst on Minnesota Vikings radio broadcasts from 1970 to 1974, as well as TVS WFL telecasts in 1974, CBS NFL telecasts from 1975 to 1979, and ABC Radio USFL broadcasts from 1983 to 1985. He also worked as a sideline reporter for CBS' coverage of Super Bowl XII. Hornung did college play-by-play for TigerVision, LSU's pay-per-view broadcasts in 1982 with ex-Green Bay Packers teammate Jim Taylor. Hornung also performed color commentary for games on College Football on TBS in the early 1980s.

Upon Rozelle's retirement in 1989, Hornung wrote him a letter crediting him with promoting the NFL's rise and for having been "the best commissioner of any [sports league]."

During a radio interview on March 30, 2004, Hornung, speaking about the recent lack of football success at Notre Dame, said, "We can't stay as strict as we are as far as the academic structure is concerned because we've got to get the black athletes. We must get the black athletes if we're going to compete." The response was immediate.  The University replied, "We strongly disagree with the thesis of his remarks. They are generally insensitive and specifically insulting to our past and current African-American student-athletes." Famed former Notre Dame head coach Ara Parseghian also disagreed with Hornung, saying that Notre Dame did not lower admission standards for him. Hornung said that he was not differentiating between races.  "We need better ball players, black and white, at Notre Dame."

Hornung’s lifetime dream was to have a horse compete in the Kentucky Derby. He had a horse on the 2013 Road to the Kentucky Derby by the name of Titletown Five, trained by friend and hall of fame trainer D. Wayne Lukas. Although the horse did not earn enough points to gain entry to the race, the horse was entered in the 2013 Preakness Stakes, finishing last.

Hornung died from dementia on November 13, 2020, at the age of 84, in Louisville, Kentucky. Dementia he felt was caused by multiple concussions. He was survived by his wife of 41 years, Angela (Cervilli) Hornung.

See also
 Paul Hornung Award
 List of NCAA major college yearly punt and kickoff return leaders

References

Further reading

External links
 
 
 
 

1935 births
2020 deaths
All-American college football players
American football halfbacks
American football placekickers
American football quarterbacks
American football running backs
American men's basketball players
American racehorse owners and breeders
American television sports announcers
Basketball players from Louisville, Kentucky
Burials at Cave Hill Cemetery
Catholics from Kentucky
College football announcers
College Football Hall of Fame inductees
Deaths from dementia in Kentucky
Green Bay Packers players
Heisman Trophy winners
LSU Tigers football announcers
Military personnel from Louisville, Kentucky
Minnesota Vikings announcers
National Football League announcers
National Football League first-overall draft picks
National Football League Most Valuable Player Award winners
Notre Dame Fighting Irish football players
Notre Dame Fighting Irish men's basketball players
Players of American football from Louisville, Kentucky
Pro Football Hall of Fame inductees
Sportspeople from Louisville, Kentucky
Sportspeople involved in betting scandals
United States Football League announcers
Western Conference Pro Bowl players
World Football League announcers